Rick D. Youngblood (born in Boise, Idaho) is an American politician who served as a member of the Idaho House of Representatives for the 12B district. Elected in November 2012, he assumed office on December 1, 2012.

Education 
Youngblood graduated from Weiser High School. He attended North Idaho College before graduating from Washington State University.

Elections

References

External links 
Rick D. Youngblood at the Idaho Legislature
Campaign site
 

Year of birth missing (living people)
Living people
Republican Party members of the Idaho House of Representatives
People from Boise, Idaho
Washington State University alumni
21st-century American politicians